The British land speed record is the fastest land speed achieved by a vehicle in the United Kingdom, as opposed to one on water or in the air. It is standardised as the speed over a course of fixed length, averaged over two runs in opposite directions.

Historical records
On 25 September 1924, Malcolm Campbell driving the 350 hp Sunbeam Blue Bird set records for the Flying Mile (146.16 m.p.h.) and Flying Kilometre (146.15 m.p.h.) at Pendine Sands, in Wales.

On 21 July 1925, Malcolm Campbell, Sunbeam Blue Bird, at Pendine Sands, broke the records for the Flying Mile (150.76 m.p.h.) and Flying Kilometre (150.86 m.p.h.).

On 16 March 1926, Henry Segrave set the land speed record in his 4-litre Sunbeam Tiger  'Ladybird'  on the sands at Southport, England at 152.3 m.p.h. "The mean time for the flying kilometre was 14.6876 seconds equal to 245.11 kilometres per hour, or 152.308 miles per hour." The car suffered supercharger failure during the record run and did not break the mile record.

On 27 April 1926, at Pendine Sands J. G. Parry-Thomas in the Higham-Thomas Special Babs set the Flying Mile record at 168.07 m.p.h. and the Flying Kilometre at 169.29 m.p.h. The following day on 28 April 1926, Parry-Thomas raised the Flying Mile to 170.62 m.p.h. and the Flying Kilometre to 171.01 m.p.h.

On 4 February 1927, Malcolm Campbell set the World Land Speed Record at Pendine Sands covering the Flying Kilometre in a mean average of 174.883 m.p.h. and the Flying Mile in 174.224 m.p.h. on the Napier-Campbell Blue Bird. These also established British records that were to last for many years. The achievement was overshadowed by the death of Parry-Thomas at Pendine Sands on 3 March 1927.

On 3 October 1970, Tony Densham, driving the Ford-powered "Commuter" dragster set a record at Elvington, Yorkshire, averaging 207.6 m.p.h. over the Flying Kilometre course. This broke Campbell's record set 43 years previously.

On 27 April 1977, Robert Horne set a Flying Mile record, at RAF Fairford, Gloucestershire, in the ex-Scuderia Montjuich Ferrari 512M, chassis number 1002, at a speed of 191.64 m.p.h.

In October 2013, Paul Drayson, set the electric land speed record reaching an average speed of 205 mph in October 2013.

On 17 May 2014 - Motorcycle - Sam Green, set the first British Electric Motorcycle Land Speed Record at Elvington Airfield in Yorkshire with Saietta R, a British electric urban sports road motorcycle brand, and in partnership with Darvill Racing team. The average record speed achieved was 100.89 mph. The first record attempt saw Saietta R achieve its top speed of 105 mph.

In May 2018 - Motorcycle - Zef Eisenberg, the fastest motorbike on sand was recorded at 201.5 mph over 1.5 miles at Pendine sands in Wales on a supercharged Suzuki Hayabusa. This was a one way record, officiated and recorded by UKTA and the British Record club. Zef Eisenberg also holds the record for World's fastest Turbine bike and Britain's fastest ever naked bike (no fairing) on his Rolls-Royce C20B Turbine powered motorbike with an average speed of 225.75 mph over a mile from a standing start at Elvington Airfield on 17 May 2015. This was recorded by UKTA and Guinness World Records.

On 6 April 2019, Zef Eisenberg, recorded the fastest ever wheel powered flying mile (Note : this was a British Record, not World Record : Cite : https://www.guinnessworldrecords.com/world-records/motorcycle-speed-record-(fastest-motorcycle)on a supercharged Suzuki Hayabusa at 182.49 mph at Pendine Sands, exceeded the flying mile record of Idris Elba in 2015 and that of Sir Malcolm Campbell in 1927.

On 17 May 2019, Zef Eisenberg, returned to Pendine with a bespoke 1200 hp Porsche 911 Turbo and on his very first pair of runs, he achieved the following records;

 Fastest sand speed record achieved by a wheel-powered vehicle at 210.332 mph at Pendine Sands.
 Fastest flying quarter (one way) wheel powered record at 206.492 mph, Pendine record (and MSA under 5000cc record).
 Fastest flying mile (one way) wheel powered record at 196.970 mph, Pendine record (and MSA under 5000cc record).
 Fastest flying mile (2 way) 187.962 mph (same measurement as Sir Malcolm Campbell), Pendine record 
 As of 2019, Zef Eisenberg, is the only person in history to have achieved over 200 mph on bike and car at Pendine, and a flying mile record in bike and car in Britain, and the only person to hold car and bike records, other than John Surtees.

Non wheel-driven vehicles
On 25 September 1980 Thrust2 driven by Richard Noble broke the Flying Mile record at a speed of 248.87 mph and the Flying Kilometre at 251.190 mph. at RAF Greenham Common.

In the summer of 1998, Colin Fallows bettered Richard Noble's outright UK Record in his Vampire jet dragster at an average speed of 269 mph at Elvington, Yorkshire. Mark Newby raised this to 272 mph in Split Second in July 2000 but Colin Fallows raised the record again on the same day using Vampire to record an average speed of 300.3 mph with a peak of 329 mph.

On 7 July 2006, Colin Fallows raised this 300.3 mph average speed again by 1 mph with an each-way average of 301 mph at RAF Fairford in Vampire. His peak speed was 331 mph, considerably in excess of the 314 mph peak achieved by Richard Hammond a few weeks afterwards just prior to crashing the car. At the same event at RAF Fairford on 7 July 2006, Mark Newby drove his jet car Split Second to an MSA/FIA accredited average speed of 338.74 mph with a peak of 362 mph, the fastest speed ever recorded in the UK. The car was unable to make a return run so the one-way record remains an unofficial one. (Sources: UK Speed Record Club, FAST Facts. RACMSA)

On 20 September 2006, Top Gear presenter Richard Hammond  reached a peak speed of   whilst being taught to drive the Vampire jet car. It was not a record attempt, and no official MSA or FIA Accredited timekeeping was in place, the peak speed of 314 mph being recorded by the BBC's own on-board data management equipment.

See also
 Land speed record

References

External links
 History of British land speed records
 BBC News article on Richard Hammond's September 2006 British land speed record attempt and crash
 The UK Land Speed Racing Association
 Speed Record Club - The Speed Record Club seeks to promote an informed and educated enthusiast identity, reporting accurately and impartially to the best of its ability on record-breaking engineering, events, attempts and history.

Land speed records
Land speed
Driving in the United Kingdom